"Puppet on a String" is a 1965 song originally recorded by Elvis Presley. It was written by Roy C. Bennett and Sid Tepper and recorded by Elvis Presley for the MGM film Girl Happy, which was released on April 14, 1965.

Background
Elvis Presley recorded the vocals for "Puppet on a String" along with other tracks on June 16, 1964 (over a backing track that was recorded earlier) during a recording session at Radio Recorders in Culver City outside of Los Angeles.

The song was published by Elvis Presley's publishing company Gladys Music, Inc.

Released in the United States in 1965 as a single with the 1960 recording from the film G.I. Blues, "Wooden Heart", on the B-side, "Puppet on a String" reached number 14 on the Billboard Hot 100 for the week of December 25, 1965, where it would stay for two weeks. (The other single from the same movie, "Do the Clam", was released earlier in the same year and reached number 21.) The single peaked at number 15 on the Record World chart and number 16 on Cash Box Singles.

In Canada, the single reached number 3 in a 10-week chart run, entering the chart in November, 1965.

The single was certified Gold in the U.S. by the RIAA in March, 1992.

Musical style and lyrics 
"Puppet on a String" is an easy listening love song or a ballad.

Charts

References 

1965 songs
1965 singles
Elvis Presley songs
RCA Records singles
Songs written by Roy C. Bennett
Songs written by Sid Tepper
Songs written for films